Lionel Zouma (born 10 September 1993) is a footballer who plays as a central defender for Swiss club Vevey United and the Central African national
 team.

Club career
Born in Lyon, Zouma began his development at Vaulx-en-Velin before moving to Sochaux, where he made his senior debut for their reserve team in CFA (fourth tier) in the second half of the 2010–11 season.

Zouma made his professional debut on 16 October 2011 in a league match against Valenciennes.

On 12 July 2016, Zouma signed a three-year contract with Greek club Asteras Tripoli of Superleague Greece. On 25 January 2018, he was released.

Following his release, Zouma trained from March 2018 with Bourg-en-Bresse. On 21 June, following their relegation to the Championnat National, he signed a two-year deal.

In 2019, he moved to Dhofar Club in Oman.

International career
In October 2017, Zouma accepted and was called up for the Central African Republic for the friendly match against Equatorial Guinea in Malabo.

Personal life
Zouma's younger brother, Kurt, plays in the same position for English club West Ham and has represented France at senior level. Another younger brother, Yoan, made his professional debut for Bolton Wanderers in 2019. Their parents emigrated from the Central African Republic.

Career statistics

References

External links

 
 
 
 

1993 births
Living people
Footballers from Lyon
Association football defenders
Citizens of the Central African Republic through descent
Central African Republic footballers
Central African Republic international footballers
French footballers
France youth international footballers
French sportspeople of Central African Republic descent
FC Sochaux-Montbéliard players
FC Vaulx-en-Velin players
Asteras Tripolis F.C. players
Football Bourg-en-Bresse Péronnas 01 players
Dhofar Club players
FC Vevey United players
Ligue 1 players
Ligue 2 players
Championnat National players
Super League Greece players
French expatriate sportspeople in Greece
French expatriate sportspeople in Oman
Expatriate footballers in Greece
Expatriate footballers in Oman
Central African Republic expatriate footballers
Central African Republic expatriate sportspeople in Greece